Fabio Del Genovese (27 May 1902 – 6 April 1976) was an Italian wrestler. He competed in the freestyle light heavyweight event at the 1924 Summer Olympics.

References

External links
 

1902 births
1976 deaths
Olympic wrestlers of Italy
Wrestlers at the 1924 Summer Olympics
Italian male sport wrestlers
Sportspeople from Pisa
20th-century Italian people